Xu Shaofa (Hsu Shao-Fa) (born 1947), is a male former international table tennis player from China.

Table tennis career
He won a gold medal at the 1975 World Table Tennis Championships  with Li Zhenshi, Liang Geliang, Lu Yuansheng and Li Peng as part of the Chinese team. In addition he won a silver medal in 1973.

See also
 List of table tennis players
 List of World Table Tennis Championships medalists

References

Chinese male table tennis players
Living people
1947 births
People from Changbai Korean Autonomous County
Table tennis players from Jilin
Asian Games medalists in table tennis
Table tennis players at the 1974 Asian Games
Medalists at the 1974 Asian Games
Asian Games gold medalists for China
Asian Games bronze medalists for China
World Table Tennis Championships medalists